The 2007 Monte Carlo Rally (formally known as the ) was a rallying autosports race held over four days between  and , and operated out of , France. It was the first race of the 2007 World Rally Championship (WRC) season. Dani Sordo finished second in the other Citröen works car, with Marcus Grönholm finishing third in a Ford.

Loeb, driving an all new Citroën C4 WRC car which had been in development throughout 2006, took control of the race from the outset, winning the two stages on the first day and four more stages over the following three days. His teammate Sordo kept the pressure on, winning three stages, but on Stage 6, Loeb extended his lead from 6.6 seconds to nearly 24 seconds, and from thereon became unattainable. Each stage on the first two Legs were won by either Loeb or Sordo, and it was not until Saturday afternoon on the second run of the day's stages, that other drivers could effectively challenge them. The last two days of the race consisted of a duel between Mikko Hirvonen, who drove a factory 2006 model Ford Focus RS WRC, and Chris Atkinson in a factory Subaru Impreza WRC 2006. After Hirvonen completed Stage 2 in fourth place, Atkinson took the position on Stage 3 and held onto it throughout Friday and into Saturday morning's stages. On Stage 12 on Saturday afternoon, Hirvonen retook fourth, Atkinson regained it on Stage 13 but then lost it to Hirvonen again following Stage 14. Atkinson won the final stage on Sunday morning, and finished the race back in fourth position.

Controversially, the 2007 Monte Carlo Rally was no longer based in Monaco and localities nearby, where it had been held in recent years. The event only visited Monte Carlo with its final special stage, a short run on part of the Circuit de Monaco and the rest of the time was spent in and around Valence hundreds of kilometres north of Monaco in the  region. The 2007 event also marked the return of the nighttime stages.

Loeb's win was his fourth at Monte Carlo and twenty-ninth in WRC. It was the sixth time that he had achieved a podium position there, which brought his WRC podium finishes to forty-eight. He earned ten points in the World Rally Championship for Drivers. Sordo was two points behind him, while Grönholm was in third position with six points. With Atkinson and Hirvonen in fourth and fifth place, Petter Solberg, Toni Gardemeister and Jan Kopecký were the other points finishers. In the World Rally Championship for Manufacturers, Citroën Total World Rally Team earned the maximum eighteen points for their 1–2 finish, BP Ford World Rally Team placed second, with ten points, with the Subaru World Rally Team placing third with eight points.

Report

Background
The 2007 Monte Carlo Rally was the first round of the 2007 World Rally Championship (WRC) season after taking a six-week break since the last race of the 2006 season in Great Britain. Only Manfred Stohl, driving for OMV-Kronos Citroën World Rally Team, was familiar with these roads, as he had competed on them in the late 1990s.

Although the 25,000 spectators seemed pleased that the rally had returned to the region, the drivers, team bosses and Fédération Internationale de l'Automobile (FIA; WRC's governing body) were less enthusiastic. The drivers hoped that with the rally taking place on higher altitudes, wintery conditions and burle (a freezing wind blowing from the north) would produce ice and snow on the ground, making for a more exciting event; however, except for some rain on Thursday evening it never came to fruition and the prevailing weather was clear and dry. Sébastien Loeb was unhappy with the weekend's weather forecast. Following his reconnaissance run, he said, "With snow everywhere and walls on both sides of the road, like in the old days, some of these stages would have been brilliant. But because it's dry, in some places that makes it less interesting because than the roads further south with all their corners." The service park in Valence was also much smaller than what had been used in Monaco, so there were no Production World Rally Championship or Junior Rally Championship categories, and  fewer entries of competitors. It was also badly located and poorly run, and WRC's commercial director David Richards said that the service area was "like a car boot sale".

After being absent from the WRC for the 2006 season to spend thirteen months concentrating on preparing their new  vehicle, the Citroën Total World Rally Team returned in 2007 ready to début it in the Monte Carlo Rally. The Citroën Xsara WRC had dominated the championship in recent years, and despite its age it was still incredibly reliable and was only replaced because the Xsara model was no longer in production. It was also higher than the Xsara, and the weight distribution had been fine-tuned, including raising and moving back the front seats (which had the negative effect of reducing the drivers' visibility), and attaching the wing mirrors to the midpoint along the front doors. The C4's test drivers reported that the car handled more stably.

The Focus, in addition had undergone its own developments during the winter break. The tarmac testing of the C4 showed it to be faster than the outgoing Xsara, but Loeb knew that that performance might not show itself in the race. "The car has been good in testing. But what about the rally?" he asked. "I don't know." Marcus Grönholm, the Ford team's number 1 driver, was wary, however. "It's got thousands of k's on the clock. It was running when the Focus WRC 06 was still on the board." The team knew that the 2006 version, which had performed poorly the previous season, would be no match for the Focus or C4. Added to the fact that the cars were equipped with unfamiliar  tyres after Pirelli decided not to supply any teams in 2007, and they were hoping that Petter Solberg and Chris Atkinson could just earn some points from the race.

Forty-nine crews registered to compete in the rally, Of the top-tier drivers entered, Jean-Marie Cuoq was the only WRC rookie, and Chris Atkinson, Henning Solberg, and Matthew Wilson had driven at Monte Carlo only once before, all in 2006. The starting order for Leg 1 was "Priority 1" (P1) and P2 WRC drivers in the order of the final classification of the 2006 season, followed by all other drivers as decided by the ACM. Loeb, the previous season's champion, set off first, followed by Grönholm, then Mikko Hirvonen. Loeb and Grönholm were the favourites to win; Loeb had won the Monte Carlo three times in a row between 2003 and 2005, and Grönholm had won in 2006. Nevertheless, there were worries that Loeb would not be physically fit enough to win. Four months earlier he had broken his left shoulder in a mountain-biking accident, and there was a chance he might not even compete in the first part of the season. His physiotherapists and consultants told him that because of the operations he had had on his arm, he should definitely have sat out the Monte Carlo Rally. Loeb admitted that he was "really stressed" before the start, and wondered whether his arm would be okay. "It has been okay in testing but what about the long stages?" he asked. His answer: "I don't know."

Race
Following a ten-year absence of nighttime-run stages, the first two Special Stages of the event were held on Thursday night. They were the first night stages scheduled in the rally since 1997. Throughout the day it had rained, and although it had stopped before the race began, the roads were still very wet and slippery. In discussing the day's weather, Grönholm said that he expected the stages that night to be difficult, and added, "I hope this time we can take the right tyres, we were always a little bit on the wrong side [last year] – it’s not easy, but I hope we will manage to get it right this time." Earlier in the day, the crews had driven a shakedown stage in Mauves; however, due to a large number of fans and spectators along the route the shakedown was stopped early, and some crews including Loeb and co-driver Daniel Elena were forced to carry out last-minute testing and necessary changes to their cars on the main roads back to Valence. Though forty-nine crews registered in the rally, only forty-seven actually competed.

His teammate Petter Solberg spoke of the challenges facing him: "[In the dark] everything gets a little bit more narrow and you always tend to be careful with how you turn in and keep the speed up in the corners, but obviously you have to listen to the pacenotes, that is absolutely crucial thing, 100%." Loeb, who was familiar with driving on nighttime stages in the French Rally Championship, said, "In the dark you have to drive like you can when you have only two passes on the recce, and then you also start with the fastest stage. I think there can be some big moments tonight." Taking third place on the stage were the Ford crew of Grönholm and Timo Rautiainen, who finished after . They had beaten all the competition by a wide margin. Loeb was almost  ahead of his teammate, while Grönholm was  adrift; and Petter Solberg, over  behind the lead.

The previous leg's provisional classification determined the starting order for Leg 2, whereby the   started in reverse order, followed by the remaining drivers in order of classification. Loeb was said to be "visibly shaken" from losing the stage to his less-experienced teammate. "I lost , my tyres were too hard," he said. "At the start they went cold and I wasn't in a good rhythm. Before we reached some dry parts I wasn't confident and I didn't want to take any big risks this morning." Petter was still trying to get used to the new BF Goodriches his car was outfitted with, but he found them too hard and said he could not find any feeling or grip with them. Hirvonen, however, felt his tyre compound was too soft, and was unimpressed with his time. The Mitsubishi Lancer WRC crew of  Xavier Pons and Xavier Amigo had other troubles during this stage. The transmission failed and they had to retire from the rally. Their teammates Toni Gardemeister and Jakke Honkanen set a good time on the stage when they finished in fifth place, as did OMV-Kronos's Manfred Stohl and Ilka Minor in sixth.

Petter Solberg had dropped out of contention for points, in ninth place overall, eighth being taken by Jan Kopecký in a privately entered . Before  got underway, the crews had a chance to change their tyres to a set with a more suitable compound. A new WRC rule for 2007 allowed for Remote Service Zones to be set up away from the main Service Park at Rally HQ. For 15 minutes the cars could be refuelled, re-tyred, and have any necessary maintenance carried out, as long as the parts and tools to do so (except fuel and tyres) were already in the vehicle. For Grönholm this was a major relief. On the previous stage his car had developed an issue with the hydraulic flappy-paddle gearchanges on his steering wheel, which meant he had had to resort to shifting gears manually. The technicians were unsure why or how it had occurred and were hoping that their repairs would last until the car got back to Valence. Loeb won an uneventful , but only by one-tenth of a second ahead of Sordo, and on  Sordo was quicker than Loeb, after Loeb stalled on the start-line and was unable to make up the lost seconds. At the midday break, Loeb was lamenting his lead over Sordo. "Now it's a big battle between the two C4s. The other cars for the moment are behind, so it's good news for the team. It would be easier if Dani were bit further behind but I have to deal wit that," he said. "I'll try to keep position this afternoon, but it's not easy. Dani is really fast. I only have a six-second lead." Grönholm was also complaining. " The only good thing here is to win this rally, but to drive here; I don't like it."

 was a rerun of the  –  stage from the morning. The roads had dried out by the afternoon, but that did not stop some crews from having accidents along the route. Stohl spun out as he went through a corner, and crashed the front of his car into the stone wall of a house. He continued on, but the front bumper was damaged and hanging loose. "We lost the front brakes completely," Stohl explained. "Absolutely no brakes. I was lucky to finish because I was nearly off sometimes." The dry roads meant that all the drivers were able to complete the stage faster than they had been in the morning. At just  Loeb was already much faster than his time during , but on a narrow stretch of the route towards the  he did not brake into a corner at the right time and skidded and collided with a fence. He was able to carry on driving, but co-driver Elena's door and sill were damaged. A repeat run of  closed the day. Sordo won  and Loeb took .

 began early Saturday morning. Loeb, Sordo, and Grönholm once again finished first, second and third. Atkinson suffered a setback when he crashed his car and stalled it. It cost him a few seconds and he finished the stage ninth, behind Hirvonen, Jean-Marie Cuoq, Gardemeister and Kopecký, but he retained his fourth place standing in the event's classifications. The surprise result of Stage 10 was Atkinson's.

Henning Solberg, meanwhile, went off the road and into a ditch as he entered one of the corners on the stage, and his brother Petter had a similar problem in the same corner, but his quick reactions were able to control the car so he just drove into the scrub and got back on track. Loeb ran his slowest time on this stage after he reduced speed and his tyres went cold. "I was a bit faster than Dani [Sordo] on the start of the stage, and then I saw my splits [times between checkpoints] and then I tried to slow down," he explained. "We had hard tyres and when you slow down the tyres [cool down] and then you lose the grip more and more, and at the end it was really tricky and I had cold tyres, so I just tried to slow down. Loeb was 1.2s slower and finished second. This reduced the gap between the two in the overall classifications to just .

After the midday service, the next three stages were reruns of the morning's. Hirvonen won  and Atkinson had another slow run, which resulted in Hirvonen taking fourth place in the provisional classification by four-tenths of a second. "Considering how ordinary I drove in the first one, I had to pull my finger out!" said Atkinson. He regained his fourth-place position just  ahead of Hirvonen. "No problem, the car is going very well," said Loeb. "One stage more to go and hopefully its okay."

Stage 14 was the last in the mountains of Ardeche, before travelling to Monte Carlo for the Super Special Stage. For most drivers it was going to be the last time to gain higher positions in the classifications. Sordo also had another bad stage. He finished the stage ninth-fastest after  on the road. Atkinson ran  slower and finished second. It was also Jari-Matti Latvala's last chance to earn a points position. Kopecký had been in eighth position and set to score one point since the middle of the second Leg, but Latvala was just  behind him going into this stage. But Latvala pushed too hard and when he drove over some loose gravel he lost control and slid the car into the end of a stone wall. The impact caused damage to the car's roll cage which forced him to retire from the rally and end his attempt to earn any points.

The final stage of the rally took place on Sunday morning. After conducting the entire race in France the organisers only paid lip service to the principality by holding a Super Special Stage there. Because the Service Park was in Valence, repairs, adjustments, refuelling and tyre changes were carried out on Saturday night ahead of the drive down to the coast. The decision about which tyres to fit on the cars was taken out of the teams' hands. ACM ordered that all the cars would drive on the snow tyres that the teams had been allocated, but had not been used because of the dry weather, a decision that was described as "absurd" because the cars ended up drifting through the corners. Loeb's, Sordo's and Grönholm's lead times so far ahead of anyone else's, so the interest in Stage 15 was on Hirvonen and Atkinson. Only eight-tenths of a second made the difference between a fourth-place position and five points, and fifth-placed position and four points. Nothing more I can do. We'll see how Chris drives and hope for the best.". Atkinson drove opposite Grönholm on the stage, with Hirvonen watching from the sidelines. He was one-tenth of a second quicker than that, which won him the stage and fourth place in the rally.

Post-race
Loeb was delighted with his win at Monte Carlo, saying, "It's a victory in Monte Carlo so that's a great moment. I like to start the season like this, with ten points. That's really important for me, the feeling is good. The car is really, really fast and my arm is much better, so everything is perfect for the moment." Guy Fréquelin, the Team Principal at  Citroën Total was also pleased with Leob's and Sordo's results. He said afterwards,

The last time a car had finished in first and second-place in its début rally was 20 years ago in the 1987 Monte Carlo Rally, when Miki Biasion and Juha Kankkunen came first and second in all-new Lancia Delta HF 4WDs. The Delta HF 4×4 also won two-thirds of all the stages of that 1987 rally, just like the C4 did this time around. Lancia also won both the Group A and Group N categories in the race, while Citroën won the 4-wheel drive WRC category and came first in the 2-wheel drive Super 1600 category.

Grönholm was disappointed with his race, admitting that he thought he might be able to beat Sordo, if not Loeb. "We got it wrong on the tyre choice, which we had to have approved by the FIA early in the week," he explained. "We thought it would rain. Harder tyres would have made life easier for us." BP-Ford was also unhappy. Christian Loriaux, the team's Technical Director said, "Having Marcus finish behind Sordo is disappointing. Being behind Loeb is easier to understand, because I didn't expect the C4 to be any slower than the Xsara, and that car had a performance edge over us last year." Petter Solberg also had issues with his tyres throughout the rally. After Subaru switched to es from Pirelli following the 2006 season, and with the shortest break between seasons the WRC had seen, the crews had not had enough time to test the new compounds. The Subarus had had their problems with the Pirellis, too. To protect them from breaking up too quickly the drivers had learned how to look after them, but driving that way on the new brand meant that he could not get the BFs up to temperature and ended up running slower. He finished the rally in sixth place. His teammate Atkinson did not have that problem though, and after fighting with Hirvonen in the final half of the rally, finished in fourth place. "It's been a massive battle, and so much fun to be in a battle with these guys again," he said after being congratulated by Hirvonen. Two drivers in non-manufacturer cars, Gardemeister and Kopecký, finished in seventh and eighth place to receive drivers points.

As a consequence of the final positions, Loeb started the season leading in the World Rally Championship for Drivers with ten points. Sordo was second with eight points, Grönholm was in third position with six points. In the World Rally Championship for Manufacturers, Stobart Ford had one point from Henning Solberg's fourteenth-placed position (although Wilson finished the rally quicker, he was not nominated to earn points for the manufacturer). Stohl earned OMV-Kronos Citroën two points. Subaru were in third place with eight points, BP-Ford were two points clear of Subaru in second place, and Citroën Total WRT was first, with eighteen points – ten from Loeb's win and eight from Sordo.

Statistics

Crew names in italics are able to score points for the manufacturer in the World Rally Championship for Manufacturers

Entry list

Special stages

Classifications

Championship standings after the event

Notes

References

External links

 2007 Monte Carlo Rally results  on WRC.com
 2007 Monte Carlo rally Results on eWRC-results.com
 2007 Monte Carlo Rally results on Jonkka's World Rally Archive
 2007 Monte Carlo rally Results on RallyBase.nl

Monte Carlo
2007
Rally
Monte
Monte Carlo Rally